Eucalyptus cephalocarpa, commonly known as mealy stringybark or silver stringybark is a species of small to medium-sized tree, that is endemic to south-eastern Australia. It has rough, fibrous bark on the trunk and branches, lance-shaped adult leaves, Flower buds arranged in groups of seven, white flowers and conical, bell-shaped or hemispherical fruit.

Description
It has thick, soft, fibrous grey-brown, fissured bark on the trunk and branches, sometimes smooth on the thinnest branches. They are the same green to bluish colour on both sides. Flowering occurs between February and June and the flowers are white.

Taxonomy and naming
Eucalyptus cephalocarpa was first formally described in 1934 by William Blakely who published the description in his book A Key to the Eucalypts. The specific epithet (cephalocarpa) is derived from the Ancient Greek words kephale meaning "head" and karpos meaning "fruit" referring to the crowded fruit of this species.

Distribution and habitat
Mealy stringybark occurs mainly in Victoria but is also in found in the Nadgee Nature Reserve in the far south-east of New South Wales. It is common around Melbourne, from the eastern suburbs to the Dandenongs and south to the Mornington Peninsula. Its range extends to near Castlemaine, Kinglake and Mallacoota.

See also
List of Eucalyptus species

References

Flora of New South Wales
Flora of Victoria (Australia)
Trees of Australia
cephalocarpa
Myrtales of Australia
Plants described in 1934
Taxa named by William Blakely